Nisu (Southern Yi) is a language cluster spoken by half a million Yi people of China. It is one of six Yi languages recognized by the government of China. The Yi script was traditionally used, though few can still read it.

The position of Nisu within Nisoish is debated. Nisu is classified as Southeastern Loloish by Pelkey (2011), but is traditionally classified as a Northern Loloish language, including by Lama (2012).

Internal classification

Chen et al. (1985)
Chen et al. (1985:114) recognizes three major varieties of Southern Yi (i.e., Nisu) spoken in Yunnan province: Shijian (石建; Shiping-Jianshui), Yuanjin (元金; Yuanjiang-Jinping), and Exin (峨新; Eshan-Xinping). Autonyms include na̠33 su55 and na̠33 su55 pho21 (alternatively ne̠33 su55 pho21). Chen (1985) reported a speaker population of nearly 1.6 million.

Shijian 石建土语: spoken in Shiping, Jianshui, Tonghai, Gejiu, Kaiyuan, Mengzi, and Hekou counties
Yuanjin 元金土语: spoken in Yuanyang, Jinping, Mojiang, Yuanjiang, Pu'er, Jiangcheng, and Honghe counties
Exin 峨新土语: spoken in Eshan, Xinping, Jiangchuan, Yuxi, Yimen, and Kunming counties

Yang (2009)
Yang (2009) classifies the Nisu dialects as follows.
Northern Nisu
North-central (Shijian 石建): spoken in Shiping, Xinping, Jiangcheng, Mojiang, and Lüchun counties
Northwestern (Exin 峨新): spoken in Eshan and Jinning counties
Southern Nisu (Yuanjin 元金): spoken in Honghe, Yuanyang, Jinping, Yuanjiang, Shiping, and perhaps also Jianshui counties
Far Northwestern Nisu: spoken in Beidou Township (北斗彝族乡), Yongping County (descendants of Nisu soldiers who migrated to Yongping during the early Ming Dynasty; most divergent Nisu variety)

The Jiangcheng, Mojiang, and Lüchun varieties were grouped by Chen (1985) to be southern varieties, but Yang (2009) found that they actually belonged to the Northern Nisu group.

Other varieties
Other Nisu or Southern Yi groups with similar autonyms or language varieties are:
Luowu 罗武 (300+ people in Xinping County (1955); 100 households in Shuangbai County; also in Zhenyuan County): 
Achang 阿常 of Niukong 牛孔, Lüchun County
Pulian 普连 of Qimaba 骑马坝, Daxing 大兴, and Gekui 戈奎, Lüchun County
Alu 阿鲁 of Dashuigou 大水沟, Lüchun County

A variety of Southern Nisu spoken in Aka Luoduo (阿卡洛多) village (also called Taiping village; 太平村), Tianfang Village (田房村), Jiangcheng County is covered in Lu Yan (2008).

In Tonghai County, Southern Yi (Nisu) is spoken by all generations only in Xiangping (象平), Bajiao (芭蕉), Sizhai (四寨), Shikan (石坎), Pingba (平坝), Shangzhuangke (上庄科), and Xiazhuangke (下庄科) villages.

Phonology

Consonants

Vowels 

 Diphthongs  occur with alveolo-palatal consonants  in complementary distribution, in the Laochang dialect.
Open-mid sounds  only occur in the Shaochong dialect.
Rhotic vowels  occur mainly in the Northwestern dialects.
 Sounds  are heard as syllabic consonants  when following alveolar sibilants or affricates, and as syllabic retroflex  when following retroflex ones.

Tones 
3 tones occur as follows:

Notes

References

 
 
 
 
 
 
 
 
 
 
 雲南彝語方言詞彙彙編3

Loloish languages
Languages of China